Jaime Eduardo Powell (January 13, 1953 – February 1, 2016) was an Argentine paleontologist who described the titanosaur sauropod dinosaur taxa Aeolosaurus and found evidence that titanosaurs have osteoderms.

Research
Powell described the first convincing fossil evidence that titanosaurs had osteoderms.

Taxa named
 Aeolosaurus rionegrinus
 Unquillosaurus ceibalii

References

1953 births
2016 deaths
Argentine paleontologists